The Centro de Alto Rendimiento Deportivo Pedro Candioti (known as Card) is a sports complex and IAAF Regional Development Centre in Santa Fe, Argentina.

It was opened in 1982 to host the II South American Games and since then it has hosted the 1983 South American Championships in Athletics; the 1985, 1994 and 2001 South American Junior Championships in Athletics; and the 1989 and 2001 Pan American Junior Athletics Championships, beside numerous seminars, congresses and courses.

See also
Sport in Argentina

External links
World Junior Athletics History
Card website

Buildings and structures in Santa Fe Province
Sport in Santa Fe Province
Sports venues completed in 1982